Margarites sordidus is a species of sea snail, a marine gastropod mollusk in the family Margaritidae.

Description

Distribution
This species occurs in the Atlantic Ocean off Nova Scotia, Canada.

References

 Turgeon, D.D., et al. 1998. Common and scientific names of aquatic invertebrates of the United States and Canada. American Fisheries Society Special Publication 26 page(s): 61

External links
 

sordidus
Gastropods described in 1846